Claudett de Jesus Ribeiro OMC is a Brazilian geographer and public administrator. In 2011, she was awarded the Ordem do Mérito Cultural. 

Ribeiro founded the Center for Afro-Brazilian studies at the Federal University of Maranhão. She served as a consultant for UNICEF, for whom she helped develop educational programs in Maranhão and Piauí. In 2009, she served as the Secretary for Racial Equality for the Brazilian government.

References

Recipients of the Order of Cultural Merit (Brazil)
Brazilian geographers
Brazilian women scientists
Women government ministers of Brazil
Women geographers